The 6th Parliament of Zimbabwe met between 2005 and 2008. At the time of the March 2005 parliamentary election, the Zimbabwean Parliament was unicameral, consisting of the 150-member House of Assembly. The Senate, abolished in 1989, was reintroduced in November 2005, consisting of 66 members. Of the 150 members in House of Assembly, 120 were elected via first-past-the-post voting in single-member constituencies. Of the remaining 30 seats, 12 members were appointed directly by the President, ten were provincial governors who were ex officio members, and eight seats were reserved for chiefs. Fifty senators were elected in the same fashion as in the House of Assembly. Of the remaining 16 Senate seats, six were appointed directly by the President and ten were reserved for chiefs.

In the March 2005 election, the ruling Zimbabwe African National Union – Patriotic Front (ZANU–PF) won a 78-seat majority of the 120 elected seats, while the Movement for Democratic Change (MDC) won 41, a 16-seat decrease from its showing in the 2000 election. The remaining seat went to Jonathan Moyo, an independent. In the November 2005 Senate election, ZANU–PF won 43 of the 50 elected seats, with the MDC taking the remaining seven. The Senate election was boycotted by much of the MDC, and the issue of whether to participate led to a split in the party. Morgan Tsvangirai's MDC–T faction, which opposed participating in the Senate election, comprised the biggest portion of the former MDC, while Welshman Ncube's smaller MDC–N faction was formed by members who had been expelled by Tsvangirai from the original MDC for standing as Senate candidates against his orders.

The members of the 6th Parliament of Zimbabwe were sworn in on 12 April 2005. ZANU–PF's John Nkomo was elected Speaker unopposed. Edna Madzongwe, also of ZANU–PF, was elected Deputy Speaker, a position she held in the previous Parliament.

Composition

Senate

House of Assembly

Elected members

Senate

House of Assembly

Unelected members

Senate

House of Assembly

Membership changes

House of Assembly

Notes and references

Notes

References 

members of the 6th Parliament of Zimbabwe